The Safe Harbor Dam (also Safe Harbor Hydroelectric Station) is a concrete gravity dam, with an associated hydroelectric power station, on the lower Susquehanna River. It is the most northerly and last of three Great Depression-era public electrification projects' hydroelectric dams, and was constructed between April 1, 1930 and December 7, 1931. It created a long and relatively shallow lake, known as Lake Clarke, along the upper stretch of the Conejohela Valley. The creation of the lake shrank the upper Conejohela Flats in size.

Base terrains
The mixed marshy terrain of the Conejohela Valley contained rapids and small waterfalls, wetlands, and thick woods along both sides of the river within a ten-year floodplain which saw annual inundations all the way down into Maryland at the headwaters of Chesapeake Bay, and experienced catastrophic floods regularly (the meaning of a ten-year floodplain). The varied terrain created many interface zones biologically nurturing a great many species. Many of those habitats effectively created difficult walking and horseback terrains, which stifled east-west crossing of the lower Susquehanna in colonial Pennsylvania-Maryland, spurring the 1730 opening of the historic Wright's Ferry and (later the first two) Columbia-Wrightsville Bridges, once believed to be the longest covered bridges in the world.

Siting
 name=ConeReg></ref> created by the damwhich has become very popular for water sports and fishing. Ecologically, the varying depth of inundated islands on the bottom of the lake create a succession of valuable varied habitats that support numerous freshwater feeder fish, pan fish, and large predatory game fish species. Thus, bird-small animal habitat that was lost was replaced, by and large, by freshwater lacustrine habitats.

Operating company
LS Power Group purchased PPL's share in 2011, and was subsequently purchased in March 2014 by Brookfield Renewable Inc. In May 2014, Brookfield purchased Exelon's share, gaining full ownership. The Safe Harbor Water Power Corporation operates the dam and power plant.

Planning and construction
Planning for the construction of the Safe Harbor Dam started in 1929, and construction started on April 1, 1930. The dam was completed and closed its gates for the first time on September 29, 1931. The first power was generated on December 7, 1931, and the last of the original seven turbine generator units came on-line on October 14, 1940. Planning for expansion of the generation capacity started in 1981. Construction started on April 12, 1982, and the five new turbine generator units came on-line between April 13, 1985 and April 12, 1986. Units 1 and 2 are Kaplan turbines connected to single-phase generators to produce 25 Hz single-phase electric power for railroad use by Amtrak and SEPTA, but also can be connected to a motor-generator to convert any spare 25 Hz power to 60 Hz. The rest of the units generate 60 Hz, three-phase power. Safe Harbor can generate 417.5 megawatts of hydroelectric power. Power from Safe Harbor is dispatched through PJM Interconnection, one of many regional transmission organizations feeding the nations power grids.

Key events
On May 18, 2001, President George W. Bush visited the Safe Harbor Hydroelectric plant to expound on his just-unveiled National Energy Policy. Safe Harbor was chosen as an example of government, corporate, and environmental groups working together in energy generation.

In 2001, Safe Harbor Water Power Corporation won the Governor's Award for Environmental Excellence.  The award citation states that Safe Harbor had removed over 11,000 tons of debris from the river and was able to recycle almost all of it.

See also 

 Conowingo Dam
 List of dams and reservoirs of the Susquehanna River
 Amtrak's 25 Hz Traction Power System

References

External links 

 Safe Harbor Water Power Company's web site

Dams in Pennsylvania
Dams on the Susquehanna River
United States power company dams
Dams completed in 1931
Energy infrastructure completed in 1931
Hydroelectric power plants in Pennsylvania
Buildings and structures in Lancaster County, Pennsylvania
Buildings and structures in York County, Pennsylvania